This is a list of extinction events, both mass and minor:

Timeline

References

Extinction events
Extinction
Mass extinction timelines